Langar railway station (Urdu and ) is railway station located in Basti Langar Khan, Punjab, Pakistan.

The station still uses Neale's token ball system, a system implement by British to avoid collision of trains on a single track.

See also
 List of railway stations in Pakistan
 Pakistan Railways

References

External links

Railway stations in Attock District
Railway stations on Kotri–Attock Railway Line (ML 2)
Railway stations on Khushalgarh–Kohat–Thal Railway